Baiba Broka may refer to:

 Baiba Broka (actress) (born 1973), Latvian actress
 Baiba Broka (politician) (born 1975), Latvian lawyer and politician